Rolf Niran Meemak Hansson (born 22 January 1996) is a Thai professional footballer who plays as a centre back or a defensive midfielder for Thai League 1 club Nongbua Pitchaya.

Career

Hansson started his career with IF Brommapojkarna.

References

1996 births
Living people
Association football defenders
Niran Hansson
Niran Hansson
Swedish footballers
Superettan players
Ettan Fotboll players
IF Brommapojkarna players
Niran Hansson
Niran Hansson
Niran Hansson
Niran Hansson
Niran Hansson
Thai expatriate sportspeople in Sweden
Niran Hansson
Swedish people of Thai descent